Lajichang (English: Garbage Dump) is a 1994 Chinese rock album by He Yong. It was the most controversial among the mainland release albums of the first generation of Beijing rock musicians.

Tracklisting

Personnel 
Personnel listed in the album's liner notes as follows:

Musicians 

 He Yong - lead vocals; guitar; sanxian
 Eddie Randriamampionona, Liu Yijun, Wu Liqun (credited as "Laozai"), Qin Qi - guitar
 Jeroen den Hengst (credited as "Hei Yulong"), Luo Yan, Hei Bei - bass
 Wang Di - bass; keyboards; accordion; additional arrangements
 Liang Heping - keyboards; additional arrangements
 Zhang Yongguang, Liu Xiaosong - drums; percussion
He Yusheng - sanxian
 Liu Qunqiang - dizi
 Central Song and Dance Troupe - additional folk instruments

Production 

 Zhang Peiren - executive producer
 Wang Di, Liang Heping - production
 Wang Xiaobo - recording; mixing
 Cao Man, Xu Gang - recording
 Yan Zhongkun - mastering; additional mixing

References

1994 albums